Amphisbaena persephone is a species of worm lizard found in Brazil.

References

persephone
Reptiles described in 2014
Taxa named by Pedro H. Pinna
Taxa named by Andre F. Mendonca
Taxa named by Adriana Bocchiglieri
Taxa named by Daniel Fernandes da Silva
Endemic fauna of Brazil
Reptiles of Brazil